The Honda Sport 90, Super 90, or S90, is a 90 cc Honda motorcycle ultra lightweight new design motorcycle, the engine based on the Honda Super Cub,  and was made from 1964 to 1969. The motorcycle continued in production In various forms for example the S90Z in  Indonesia.  

The single-cylinder OHC air-cooled engine links to a four-speed manual transmission. It has a hand clutch, and shifting is "1 down, 3 up," with neutral in between 1st and 2nd. There is no tachometer but the speedometer indicates speed ranges for each gear. The top speed was claimed to be 64 mph, and the engine is rated at 8 horsepower. 

The engine holds a quart of oil and has an internal centrifugal oil filter, and the exhaust has a removable baffle. A metal cylinder behind the carburetor holds the air filter. Tools go under the seat in their own compartment.  

The frame is Pressed Steel rather than Tubular steel to minimize weight and the bike is fitted with telescopic front forks for improved road holding. The motorcycle was not intended for off-road use, as evidenced by the narrow handlebars and street tires; it included no accessories for such travel.  was not hard to attain, even with spirited riding.  

There are a variety of models including the Honda S90, CS90, and the Benly 90.  The date of manufacturing can be determined by removing the fuel tank and examining the tag surrounding the wiring harness.

References
   

Sport 90
Motorcycles introduced in 1964